The 1993 Copa del Rey Final was the 91st final of the King's Cup. The final was played at Estadio de Mestalla in Valencia, on 26 June 1993, being won by Real Madrid, who beat Real Zaragoza 2–0.

Details

References

1989
1
Real Madrid CF matches
Real Zaragoza matches
20th century in Valencia